Cucciolo is the title character of an Italian long-lasting comic book series.

Background 
Cucciolo, together with the inseparable friend Beppe, are a couple of comic characters created in 1940 by Giuseppe Caregaro as writer and Rino Anzi as artist as an imitation of Disney characters Mickey Mouse and Goofy. They were originally drawn as two cute anthropomorphic animals, and were protagonists of humorous-adventure stories in which they face the bad Bombarda, an imitation of Pete. Their stories were originally published in the comic magazine Gli Albi Del Scimiottino and in a number of other magazines, then Cucciolo named an eponym comic magazine, published by Edizioni Alpe (later Edizioni Bianconi) from 1948 to 1986. 

Starting from post-war era the cartoonist Giorgio Rebuffi revolutioned the comics, turning the two protagonists in two humans, giving them well-defined personalities and enhancing the satirical side of their stories.  

Several supporting characters, such as the superhero Tiramolla and the wolf Pugacioff, later became they themselves leading characters of successful spin-off series.

References 

Italian comic strips
Italian comics characters
Comics magazines published in Italy
Male characters in comics
Male characters in advertising
Satirical comics
Comics characters introduced in 1940
1940 comics debuts
Humor comics
Magazines established in 1948
Magazines disestablished in 1986
1986 comics endings
Magazine mascots
Mascots introduced in 1940
Italian-language magazines
Defunct magazines published in Italy
Fictional Italian people